Édouard-Gabriel Rinfret,  (May 12, 1905 – January 11, 1994) was a Canadian lawyer, politician and judge.

Born in Saint-Jérôme, Quebec, the son of Thibaudeau Rinfret, he was called to the Quebec bar in 1928. He was elected to the House of Commons of Canada in 1945 for the Quebec riding of Outremont. He was re-elected in 1949. A Liberal, he was Postmaster General from 1949 to 1952.

From 1952 to 1977, he was a judge of the Quebec Court of Appeal. From 1977 to 1980, he was the  Chief Justice of the Province of Quebec.

In 1982, he was made an Officer of the Order of Canada. In 1979, he was awarded an honorary Doctor of Laws from the University of British Columbia.

There are Édouard Rinfret fonds at Library and Archives Canada and Bibliothèque et Archives nationales du Québec.

References

External links
 

1905 births
1994 deaths
Judges in Quebec
Liberal Party of Canada MPs
Members of the House of Commons of Canada from Quebec
Officers of the Order of Canada
Postmasters General of Canada
People from Saint-Jérôme
Members of the King's Privy Council for Canada
Canadian King's Counsel